Goudhurst is a closed railway station on the closed Hawkhurst Branch in Kent, England.

History
It was named after the parish, but following the presentation of a petition to the Cranbrook & Paddock Wood Railway Company in November 1892, the name was changed to Goudhurst on 1 December 1892. The station was approximately one mile to the west of the village of Goudhurst which was some 250 ft higher than the station, presenting a somewhat daunting task for a baggage-laden passenger. The station achieved some degree of fame when it appeared in the 1950s children's television series "The Old Pull and Push". It also featured in the 1953 children's film Adventures in the Hopfields.

The station was closed with the line on 12 June 1961. The fine station building was demolished in the 1960s and replaced with a private dwelling called "Haltwhistle" which is situated on the area where the goods yard would have been. The property is surrounded by high conifer trees and a swimming pool has been put in between part of the former platforms. The old station lights line the drive to the house.

Accidents
On 18 February 1948 C Class locomotive 1225 was wrongly despatched into the north sidings at Goudhurst and derailed.

References

External links

 Goudhurst railway station Disused Stations
 Goudhurst station on navigable 1946 O. S. map
Signal diagram, 1948

Disused railway stations in Kent
Railway stations in Great Britain opened in 1892
Railway stations in Great Britain closed in 1961
1892 establishments in England
1961 disestablishments in England
Former South Eastern Railway (UK) stations